Malcom Filipe Silva de Oliveira (born 26 February 1997), or simply Malcom, is a Brazilian-born Russian professional footballer who plays as a forward for Russian Premier League club Zenit Saint Petersburg.  He is mostly deployed as a right winger.

He began his career at Corinthians, making his professional debut in 2014 and winning the 2015 Campeonato Brasileiro Série A. In January 2016, he transferred to Bordeaux, where he played 96 total games and scored 23 goals over the next two-and-a-half years. He signed for Barcelona for an initial fee of €41 million in 2018. A year later, he signed for Zenit for a fee of €40 million.

Club career

Corinthians
Born in São Paulo, Malcom began his career in the youth of his hometown club Corinthians. In early 2014, he starred in the side that came runners-up to Santos in the Copa São Paulo de Futebol Júnior.

He was called by coach Mano Menezes into the first team and made his professional debut on 19 March 2014 in a Copa do Brasil first-round game away to Bahia de Feira, playing the last ten minutes of the 2–0 win in place of Jádson. Four days later he made his sole appearance of the Campeonato Paulista season, coming on around the same mark for Luciano in a 3–0 home win over Atlético Sorocaba.

Malcom made his Campeonato Brasileiro Série A debut on 27 April 2014 as a substitute for Romarinho in a 2–0 home win over Flamengo. He scored his first professional goal on 18 September, opening a 1–1 draw with Chapecoense at Arena Corinthians.

He was a regular first-team player during the 2015 Campeonato Brasileiro Série A championship campaign. He played a total of 70 games and scored ten goals during his tenure at the club.

Bordeaux

French team Bordeaux signed Malcom on 31 January 2016, replacing Sunderland-bound Wahbi Khazri. The club paid €5 million for half of his economic rights.

He made his Ligue 1 debut a week later, starting in a 4–1 home loss to Saint-Étienne and being substituted for Thomas Touré after 69 minutes. On 10 February, he scored his first goal in the last 16 of the Coupe de France, putting the Girondins 3–2 up in extra time in a 3–4 loss to Nantes, also at the Nouveau Stade de Bordeaux. It was not until 30 April that he made an assist, for Cheick Diabaté in a 4–2 win at Troyes, and the following week he scored his lone league goal of the season to open a 3–0 home victory against Lorient.

On 27 September 2017, Malcom signed a new contract, tying him to the club until June 2021. His final season was his most prolific, with 12 goals, all in the league. This commenced with two on 19 August in a 3–3 draw at Lyon, including a long-distance equaliser in added time.

With several influential displays, he quickly became a fan favourite at the club, spending three seasons and scoring 23 goals in 96 appearances across all competitions. His long-range goal against Dijon on 1 December 2017 was voted Goal of the Season at the Trophées UNFP du football.

Barcelona
On 24 July 2018, Spanish club Barcelona announced the signing of Malcom on a five-year contract for a reported transfer fee of €41 million plus an additional €1 million in bonuses. Corinthians received 2.5% of the fee.

He was previously close to joining Roma, with fans waiting for him to arrive at the airport and sporting director Monchi stating that the Italians would consider taking legal action against Barcelona.

Due to limits on players without European Union passports, Malcom was left out from the Barcelona squad that won the 2018 Supercopa de España. On 25 August, he made his official debut for the club in a 1–0 victory over Real Valladolid at the José Zorrilla, replacing compatriot Philippe Coutinho with six minutes left. On 6 November, Malcom scored his first competitive goal for Barcelona in a 1–1 away draw against Inter Milan in the UEFA Champions League. On 6 February 2019, Malcom was given a surprising start against Real Madrid in the Copa del Rey semi-finals first leg, scoring the equalizer in a 1–1 draw. On 2 April 2019, Malcom scored his first La Liga goal in a 4–4 draw away against Villarreal CF.

Zenit

On 2 August 2019, Malcom joined Zenit Saint Petersburg on a five-year deal for a €40 million fee with an additional €5 million in variables. He made his debut the next day in a 1–1 home draw with FC Krasnodar, as a 71st-minute substitute for Alexey Sutormin. Due to injuries, he only played 64 minutes up to 4 October. He came back to the field on 29 February 2020 when he played 90 minutes in a goalless home draw with Lokomotiv Moscow.

On 2 May 2021, he scored the final goal of the game as Zenit secured their third title in a row in a 6–1 victory over second-place FC Lokomotiv Moscow.

On 22 July 2022, Malcom extended his contract with Zenit until 2027.

International career
Malcom was called up to Brazil's under-20 national team to compete at the South American Youth Football Championship in Uruguay, where he scored one goal in six matches as the Seleção finished in fourth place.

Later that year, he was called as a replacement for Kenedy for the 2015 FIFA U-20 World Cup in New Zealand. Malcom appeared in five matches, including the final, where Brazil lost to Serbia.

In September 2018, Malcom was called up by coach Tite for the senior team ahead of friendlies against Saudi Arabia and Argentina.

On 17 June 2021, Malcom was named in the Brazil squad for the 2020 Summer Olympics, but was replaced after having his participation in the tournament vetoed by his club Zenit. On 14 July, however, following an injury to Douglas Augusto and the opening of a spot, it was announced that he had been cleared by Zenit and rejoined the team. On 7 August 2021, he scored the winning goal in a 2–1 victory over Spain in the Olympics Final after extra time.

Personal life
Malcom's father named him after the African American activist Malcolm X.

In July 2015, state authorities in São Paulo discovered a fraud scheme when it was revealed that Malcom had obtained his driving licence – which usually takes three months of practice – only twenty days after his 18th birthday.

Malcom received criticism for his social media actions at Bordeaux in September 2017, when he posed for a photo with opponent Neymar after a heavy loss to Paris Saint-Germain, and three months later he and his compatriot teammates recorded a light-hearted video outside the stadium after a defeat.

On 24 February 2023, Malcom acquired citizenship of Russia.

Career statistics

Club

Honours
Corinthians
Campeonato Brasileiro Série A: 2015

Barcelona
La Liga: 2018–19

Zenit Saint Petersburg
 Russian Premier League: 2019–20, 2020–21, 2021–22
 Russian Cup: 2019–20
 Russian Super Cup: 2020, 2021, 2022

Brazil U20
FIFA U-20 World Cup runner-up: 2015

Brazil U23
Summer Olympics: 2020

Brazil
Superclásico de las Américas: 2018

Individual
Ligue 1 Goal of the Year: 2017–18

References

External links

Profile at the FC Zenit Saint Petersburg website

Malcom at playmakerstats.com (English version of ogol.com.br)

Profile   at Girondins.com

1997 births
Living people
Footballers from São Paulo
Brazilian emigrants to Russia
Russian people of Brazilian descent
Naturalised citizens of Russia
Brazilian footballers
Russian footballers
Association football forwards
Sport Club Corinthians Paulista players
FC Girondins de Bordeaux players
FC Barcelona players
FC Zenit Saint Petersburg players
Campeonato Brasileiro Série A players
Ligue 1 players
La Liga players
Russian Premier League players
Brazil youth international footballers
Brazil under-20 international footballers
2015 South American Youth Football Championship players
Brazilian expatriate footballers
Brazilian expatriate sportspeople in France
Brazilian expatriate sportspeople in Spain
Brazilian expatriate sportspeople in Russia
Expatriate footballers in France
Expatriate footballers in Spain
Expatriate footballers in Russia
Olympic footballers of Brazil
Footballers at the 2020 Summer Olympics
Olympic medalists in football
Olympic gold medalists for Brazil
Medalists at the 2020 Summer Olympics